Douglas and District F.C. are a football club from Douglas on the Isle of Man. They compete in the Isle of Man Football League. They play their home games at Groves Road in Douglas.

History
For more information, please visit the official website.

The club evolved from Barclays (IOM) FC who were formed in 1996. As the number of players affiliated with the bank decreased, the club made the decision to change their name to Douglas & District FC in 2002. The club have only ever competed in Division Two. In 2005, Dave Quirk was elected as the club's first Life Member.

The club have a reserve team who compete in the Isle of Man Football Combination. Douglas and District also joined the Isle of Man Football Association Veterans League in 2011, started junior boys teams in 2012, junior girls teams in 2016 and a walking football team in 2020.

Douglas and District Football Club won the 2007–08, 2014–15 and 2015–16 Fred Faragher Memorial Trophy for the fewest disciplinary points gained by players over the season. Started in 1969, presented by Castletown MFC in memory of Fred Faragher, originally for referee marks for sportsmanship.

Douglas and District were awarded the FA Community Awards Charter Standard Development Club of the Year for 2012–13, 2013–14, 2016-17 and 2021–22.

Each year since 1997, the club has embarked on a tour. The places visited have been as follows:

* Due to COVID-19 pandemic.

Ground

For more information, please visit the official website.

Douglas and District play their home games at Noble's Park in Douglas, using changing rooms 1 (home) and 2 (away), to the far left of the pavilion. Parking spaces are available at the rear of the pavilion and Grandstand, and are accessible from St. Ninian's Road.

Originally, the club played at Groves Road, just across from Springfield Road, Pulrose. They moved from there at the end of the 2009–10 season. This was due to the demolition of the NSC changing room block. From 14 August to 16 October 2010, Union Mills Football Club kindly allowed the club to play their home games at their Garey Mooar pitch in Braddan.

They played over half of their home matches at Groves Road for the 2020-21 season. They played their home matches at the Bowl for the 2021–22 season. They will be playing home matches at Groves Road for the 2022–23 season.

Statistics

For more information, please visit the official website.

Highest League Position: 7th, 2021-22
Most League Wins: 10, 2002–03
Best League Win Percentage: 40.91%, 2021-22
Least League Defeats: 12, 2021-22
Best League Defeat Percentage: 53.85%, 2002–03
Most League Goals Scored: 69, 2002–03
Best Goals Scored Per League Game Average: 2.65, 2002–03
Least League Goals Conceded: 82, 1999–2000
Best Goals Conceded Per League Game Average: 3.15, 1999–2000
Most League Points: 32, 2002–03
Best Points Per Game Average: 1.27, 2021-22

Seasons

Key

P = Played
W = Games won
D = Games drawn
L = Games lost
F = Goals for
A = Goals against
Pts = Points
Pos = Final position
Div 2 = Isle of Man Football League Division Two
PR = Preliminary Round
R1 = Round 1
QF = Quarter Finals
SF = Semi Finals
^ = Only 13 teams not 14 entered Division Two for 2001/2002.
# = Jurby disbanded prior to the 2009/2010 season, leaving 13 teams in Division Two.
CV = The season was abandoned, due to the COVID-19 pandemic.

References

External links

Football clubs in the Isle of Man
1996 establishments in the Isle of Man
Association football clubs established in 1996